Joseph Russel Robinson (July 8, 1892 – September 30, 1963) was an American ragtime, dixieland, and blues pianist and composer. He was a member of the Original Dixieland Jass Band.

Career
Robinson was born in Indianapolis, Indiana. In his teens he worked as a pianist in theaters to provide music for silent movies. With a right arm that was damaged by polio, he formed unusual techniques with his left hand. 
With his brother John, a drummer, he toured the southern United States in the early 1910s with an extended stay in New Orleans.

He started publishing compositions in his teens; his early hits included "Sapho Rag" and "Eccentric". His compositions were published as piano rolls by Imperial, the United Music Company, and QRS. He signed a contract with QRS to record blues songs from 1918 to 1921. He worked as a manager for the publishing company owned by W.C. Handy.

Robinson became a member of the Original Dixieland Jass Band in 1919, replacing on piano Henry Ragas, who died on February 18, 1919, in the flu epidemic. Aside from the band, in the early to middle 1920s he played piano for vocalists such as Lizzie Miles and Lucille Hegamin. In the 1930s he became the head of NBC Radio's music department and was a major factor in reuniting the now scattered band. The reunion in 1936 yielded six RCA Victor recordings as "The Original Dixieland Five," several network radio appearances (one with Benny Goodman), and an appearance in a "March of Time" movie short, with J. Russel Robinson speaking on-camera.

At the end of the decade Robinson moved to California and continued to write songs.

Compositions 

Robinson's songs include "That Eccentric Rag", "Margie", "A Portrait of Jennie", "Beale Street Mama",  "Aggravatin' Papa", "Reefer Man", and  "Singin' the Blues".

Awards and honors
"Singin' the Blues" was inducted into the Grammy Hall of Fame in a 1927 recording by Frankie Trumbauer and His Orchestra featuring Bix Beiderbecke on cornet.

See also 
 List of ragtime composers

References

External links 
 Biography
 
 J. Russel Robinson recordings at the Discography of American Historical Recordings.

1892 births
1963 deaths
20th-century American pianists
20th-century American male musicians
American jazz pianists
American jazz songwriters
American male pianists
American male songwriters
Dixieland jazz musicians
American male jazz musicians
Musicians from Indiana
Original Dixieland Jass Band members
Ragtime composers